Jan Verheyen may refer to:
Jan Verheyen (footballer), Belgian retired footballer
Jan Verheyen (director), Belgian film director of e.g. Dossier K.